Lesser bulb fly is a common name for several insects and may refer to:

Eumerus strigatus
Eumerus funeralis